Minnesota United FC is an American professional soccer team based in Minneapolis, Minnesota, that competes in Major League Soccer (MLS).

This is a list of franchise records for Minnesota United, which dates from their inaugural season in 2017 to present.

Career Player records

Most appearances 

USOC = U.S. Open Cup; CCL = CONCACAF Champions League; MLS is Back = MLS is Back Tournament (Knockout Rounds)

Bold signifies current Minnesota United player

Top Goalscorers

USOC = U.S. Open Cup; CCL = CONCACAF Champions League; MLS is Back = MLS is Back Tournament (Knockout Rounds)

Bold signifies current Minnesota United player

Top Assists

USOC = U.S. Open Cup; CCL = CONCACAF Champions League; MLS is Back = MLS is Back Tournament

Bold signifies current Minnesota United player

Clean sheets

Saves & GAA

Single Season Player Records
 Note: MLS Regular Season stats only. Bold indicates current season in progress.

Top Goalscorers

Top Assists

Clean sheets

Coaching records 

Note: includes US Open Cup, MLS is Back knockout round and MLS Cup results 
Bold signifies current Minnesota United coach

List of seasons

Club Captains

Designated Players

Bold signifies current Minnesota United player

Generation Adidas Players

Bold signifies current Minnesota United player

Homegrown Players

Bold signifies current Minnesota United player

Transfers
As per MLS rules and regulations; some transfer fees have been undisclosed and are not included in the tables below.

Highest transfer fees paid

References

Minnesota United FC
Minnesota United FC
Minnesota United FC records and statistics